Humanitas University (Italian: Università HUMANITAS di Milano), also known as Hunimed, is an Italian private university dedicated to the medical sciences. The campus is based in the municipality of Rozzano, a part of the Metropolitan City of Milan, and is located within the Humanitas Research Hospital Campus.

Humanitas University provides a six-year course in Medicine taught in English. They also provide a three-year course in Nursing and a three-year course in Physiotherapy, which are taught in Italian. 
As part of their speciality school degree programs, the university offers 11 courses. Including an advanced postgraduate course in Cardiovascular MR Imaging, a Master's in Endoscopy and a Master's in Urology.

History
The Institute was established and legally recognized on the 20th of June 2014 by way of a decree signed by the Italian Minister of Education.

Campus
"Humanitas University is built by the hospital, inside the hospital. All the tutors are specifically trained and work as medical doctors or nurses in the hospital. All campus facilities are located within the hospital area."

Organization
The university is part of the Humanitas Group, a private hospital group that also operates the Humanitas Research Hospital in Milan.  Humanitas Group is part of a larger company, Techint Group. In 2016 Humanitas University signed an agreement with Benedictine College in Atchison, Kansas, United States, to facilitate admission of Benedictine College pre-med students into its Medicine and Surgery degree program.

Academic programs
The university offers the Doctor of Medicine and Surgery degree program taught entirely in English. Its speciality schools grant degrees related to general surgery, cardiovascular diseases, digestive system diseases, internal medicine, medical oncology and diagnostic radiology.  Master's degrees are awarded in the fields of Endoscopy and Urology.

The university also offers a Cardiovascular MR Imaging course,  It is tailored for technologists with strong core expertise in the fields of magnetic resonance imaging or cardiology.

The Endocrinology, Metabolic Disorders and Nuclear Medicine programs are developed with the collaboration of other leading teaching institutes.

An agreement between Humanitas University and Benedictine College allows Humanitas students to take the United States Medical License Examination Steps 1 and 2. This makes students eligible for the medical residency program in the United States.

Student placement

For student placements, Hunimed implements a collaboration with the US National Board of Medical Examiners (NBME) with the following aims:
Reviewing the educational program – curriculum and student assessments – to meet U.S. standards;

Providing Advice on: 
The usage of the most appropriate assessment instruments applied in North America and International medical schools.
How best to prepare students for these assessments.

See also
Guido Torzilli

References

External links
 Humanitas University Website
 Hunimed FAQ 

Humanitas University
2014 establishments in Italy
Educational institutions established in 2014